Andrea Lagunes Barrales, known as Andrea Lagunes is a Mexican singer and actress, born in Mexico City on October 29, 1992. She started to work on television shows at the age of four and became famous by starring in the telenovela Gotita de amor (Droplet of Love).

Career 

At the age of three years, Andrea Lagunes joined the Center for Arts Education of Televisa, where she received acting and dance lessons for 3 years. At the age of four years she appeared in 25 episodes of the soap opera Maria Isabel produced by Carla Estrada, after participating in programs such as Plaza Sesamo and Que nos Pasa?.

In 1998 she starred in the telenovela Gotita de amor, for which she recorded an album under the same name. The album was composed of 13 songs. After the successful soap opera, she debuted on stage in the play "Little Red Riding Hood and the Three Little Pigs".

In 1999, she appeared in the soap operas Alma Rebelde and Cuento de Navidad, and later in Mi Destino Eres Tu, playing the role of Ximena.

In the same year she recorded her second album, A Love Jet.

Andrea has also done commercials in Caracas Venezuela. and has appeared on several unit as Furcio and Caroline in Real Life. For the year 2001 participated in the soap opera Carita de Angel of Nicandro Diaz.

For the year 2002 had a brief participacion in the soap opera Vivan los Ninos, playing Miranda, a brat and selfish child, who grew up without her mother at her side.

She also participated in "Operation Triumph GalaNovela" with the cast of Televisa Kids.

Television appearances 

 El espacio de Tatiana
 Mujer, casos de la vida real (2001–2005) – 6 episodes
 Plaza Sésamo
 ¿Qué nos pasa?
 Hoy
 Vida TV
 La Familia Peluche
 Furcio
 GalaNovela de Operación Triufo
 La rosa de Guadalupe
 Como dice el dicho

Soap operas 

 María Isabel (1997) – Gloria Mendiola (niña)
 Mi pequeña traviesa (1997–1998)
 Gotita de amor (1998) – Isabel Arredondo De Santiago
 Alma rebelde (1999) – Angelita
 Cuento de navidad (1999) .... Niña ángel
 Mi destino eres tú (2000) – Ximena Rivadeneira Pimentel
 Carita de ángel (2001) – Irma Valadez
 ¡Vivan los niños! (2002) – Miranda
 Lo Que La Vida Me Robo (2014) – Diana Garcia

Theater 

 Caperucita Roja y los Tres Cochinitos
 El Hado Zorro y el Ruiseñor de Oro
 Ricitos de Oro
 El Mago de Oz

Discography 

 Gotita de Amor (1998)
 Un Chorro de Amor (1999)

References 

1992 births
Living people
Actresses from Mexico City
Singers from Mexico City
Mexican child actresses
Mexican stage actresses
Mexican telenovela actresses
Mexican television actresses
21st-century Mexican singers